The 1991 Individual Ice Speedway World Championship was the 26th edition of the World Championship  The Championship was held on ?, 1991 in Assen in the Netherlands. 

Sergei Ivanov won the world title defeating Per-Olof Serenius in a race off after both riders finished on 26 points.

Classification

See also 
 1991 Individual Speedway World Championship in classic speedway
 1991 Team Ice Racing World Championship

References 

Ice speedway competitions
World